Hermann Schmiechen (22 July 1855 – c. 1923 or 1925) was a German portrait painter and Theosophist.

Biography 
Hermann Schmiechen was born in Neumarkt, Prussian Silesia. In 1872, he entered the Royal Academy of Arts and Crafts at Breslau, where he learned by Albrecht Bräuer (1830–1897). In 1873, he shifted into Düsseldorf school of painting and became student of Karl Müller and Eduard von Gebhardt, and was also a member of the artists association Malkasten. After studying at the Kunstakademie Düsseldorf, he learned in Paris at the Académie Julian.

In 1883, on the recommendation of August Becker, Schmichen, almost simultaneously with Karl Rudolf Sohn, was invited into England to paint portraits of the British aristocracy. From 1884 to 1895 he was a member of the Royal Academy of Arts.

Theosophical portraits 
June 20, 1884, a year after arriving in London, Schmiechen became a member the Theosophical Society. Then, fulfilling the request of Helena Blavatsky, he began to paint portraits of the Theosophical mahatmas. The portrait of the mahatma Koot Hoomi she assessed as "excellent" and immediately asked Schmiechen to begin working on a portrait of the mahatma Morya. It took him about three weeks, to complete these paintings.

A Russian writer Vsevolod Solovyov reported his impression of the portraits of the Theosophical mahatmas as follows:
"Subsequently, when I had thoroughly examined these portraits, I found in them much that was unsatisfactory from an artistic point of view; but their life-likeness was remarkable, and the eyes of the two mysterious strangers gazed straight at the spectator, their lips could almost have been said to move... Schmiechen had painted two beautiful young men. Mahatma Koot Hoomi, clad in a graceful sort of robe, trimmed with fur, had a tender, almost feminine face and gazed sweetly with a pair of charming light eyes. But as soon as one looked at 'the master' [of Blavatsky], Koot Hoomi, for all his tender beauty, was at once forgotten. The fiery black eyes of the tall Morya fixed themselves sternly and piercingly upon one, and it was impossible to tear oneself away from them."
In 1901, Schmiechen, returning into Germany, settled in Berlin and joined the German section of the Theosophical Society.

Paintings 

 Bildnis einer Dame (in German)
 Opernsängerin Lillian Nordica, 1878 (in German)
 Princess Victoria of Hesse
 Princess Elizabeth of Hesse
 Princess Mary Adelaide, Duchess of Teck, 1882
 Princess Frederica of Hanover, Baroness von Pawel-Rammingen, 1884
 Turtelndes Liebespaar am Fenster, 1895 (in German)
 Dame mit Rosenkorb, 1895 (in German)

See also 
 Agni Yoga
 Theosophists as artists
 Theosophy (Blavatskian)

Notes

References

Sources

External links 

 Schmiechen's paintings in the Royal Collection
 List of the journal publications by/about Schmiechen

1855 births
1920s deaths
19th-century German painters
19th-century male artists
20th-century German painters
20th-century male artists
German portrait painters
Académie Julian alumni
Kunstakademie Düsseldorf alumni
German Theosophists
People from Środa Śląska